Adam's Wrath is an adventure module for the 2nd edition of the Advanced Dungeons & Dragons fantasy role-playing game.

Plot summary
Adam's Wrath pits mid-level PCs against Doctor Victor Mordenheim and his minions. The adventure includes a visit to a haunted mansion, a showdown with living snow, and a climax on the Isle of Agony.

Publication history
Adam's Wrath was written by Lisa Smedman, and published by TSR, Inc. Doug Stewart did editing and additional development.

Reception
Rick Swan reviewed Adam's Wrath for Dragon magazine #207 (July 1994). He reviewed this adventure with the supplement Van Richten's Guide to the Created, and commented that the "AD&D game meets Frankenstein in these first-rate supplements for the Ravenloft setting." He suggested considering "Guide to the Created a warm-up for the Adam's Wrath adventure". According to Swan, the "most unforgettable moment comes early, when the party regains consciousness in Mordenheim's lightning tower. I don't want to give it away, but suffice to say that when you awaken, 'Something is wrapped around your head, covering your eyes...'"

References

Ravenloft adventures
Role-playing game supplements introduced in 1994